Man Of Aran is a soundtrack album from Brighton-based English indie rock band Sea Power, then known as "British Sea Power". It was released on 18 May 2009 in the UK. The CD album was released with an accompanying DVD of the 1934 film Man of Aran, to which the album serves as a score.

Track listing 
 "Man of Aran" (Hamilton) - 3:39
 "The South Sound" - 11:32
 "Come Wander with Me" (Jeff Alexander) - 4:11
 "Tiger King" (Noble) - 5:16
 "The Currach" - 2:10
 "Boy Vertiginous" (Yan) - 5:16
 "Spearing the Sunfish" - 11:42
 "Conneely of the West" (Hamilton) - 4:20
 "The North Sound" (Hamilton) - 4:55
 "Woman of Aran" (Hamilton) - 4:35
 "It Comes Back Again" (Hamilton) - 11:12
 "No Man Is an Archipelago" (Noble) - 4:49

Personnel 
 Yan (Scott Wilkinson) - Vocals, guitar
 Noble (Martin Noble) - Guitar
 Hamilton (Neil Wilkinson) - Bass, vocals, guitar
 Wood (Matthew Wood) - Drums
 Abi Fry (Abi Fry) - Viola
 Phil The Wandering Horn (Phil Sumner) - Cornet

Artwork 
The sleeve was designed by BSP, Wood and Alison Fielding, with the sleevenotes written by Vince Trident.

References 

British Sea Power albums
2009 albums
Aran Islands
Rough Trade Records albums